Musa Kanu (born 4 March 1976) is a retired Sierra Leonean football midfielder. He was a squad member for the 1994 and 1996 African Cup of Nations.

References

1976 births
Living people
Sierra Leonean footballers
Sierra Leone international footballers
K.S.C. Lokeren Oost-Vlaanderen players
HSV Hoek players
K. Berchem Sport players
Association football midfielders
Sierra Leonean expatriate footballers
Expatriate footballers in Belgium
Sierra Leonean expatriate sportspeople in Belgium
Expatriate footballers in the Netherlands
Sierra Leonean expatriate sportspeople in the Netherlands
1994 African Cup of Nations players
1996 African Cup of Nations players